Breath diagnostics involves the analysis of a sample of human breath to monitor, diagnose, and detect diseases and conditions. Besides its primary constituents – nitrogen, oxygen, carbon dioxide and water vapour – exhaled human breath contains over one thousand other compounds at trace levels. Many of these species are formed as the by-products of metabolic processes and can be indicative of a number of different diseases and conditions. Examples of such biomarkers are outlined below:

Acetone - Diabetes mellitus
Ammonia - Renal Disease
Hydrogen Sulfide - Liver Cirrhosis
Methane - Colonic Fermentation

Breath Acetone for Diabetes Diagnosis 
Diabetes mellitus is a serious chronic illness that affects how the body uses food, and is a life-threatening human disease if left untreated. It affects more than 171 million people worldwide.

Diabetes mellitus can be subdivided into; type I diabetes, where the body does not produce insulin, the hormone which facilitates the uptake of glucose by cells; and type II diabetes, where the body becomes resistant to insulin, thus inhibiting the extent of glucose usage. In each case, the ineffective use of glucose as a source of energy leads to the subsequent breakdown of fatty acids to compensate. This consumption of fatty acids by ketosis, produces acetone which is excreted into the blood, before equilibrating with air in the lungs. Diabetes may therefore be characterised by elevated breath acetone levels.
There are several new technologies being developed to diagnose and monitor diabetes by means of an acetone breath test. It is hoped that the breath test will one day supersede the use of finger-prick blood tests and provide non-invasive diabetes monitoring. These technologies  include Cavity Enhanced Absorption Spectroscopy (CEAS) and Plasma Emission Spectroscopy (PES).

Volatile Organic compound mixture for early diagnosis, phenotyping, and therapy response prediction 
The current state of the art of breath diagnostics is the use of an Electronic nose to detect the complete mixture of Volatile organic compound (VOCs) in the human breath. Breathomix BV is providing the latest advancement: BreathBase®, that is able to diagnose lung cancer up to two years earlier than standard clinical care. It can tell doctors who will respond to immunotherapy and it is able to distinguish different subtypes of disease in asthma and COPD. Therefore, treatment of asthma / COPD will be easier and tailored to the individual patient bringing us a step closer to personalized medicine / precision medicine.

Breath aerosol analysis 
Breath aerosol analysis consists in the sampling and analysis of particles emitted in the respiratory tract and present in exhaled breath. This is a relatively new field that holds great promise for direct diagnostics of pathogens, such as Influenza, and for in-vivo monitoring of the respiratory lining fluid (Respiratory epithelium) components, such as proteins and phospholipids. Various methods are used for sampling exhaled breath aerosols, such as filters, impactors, impingement filter, or electrostatic precipitators.
This latter field is related to that of Bioaerosol sampling and analysis.

References 

Breath tests